Peter Kornbluh (born 1956) is the director of the National Security Archive's Chile Documentation Project and Cuba Documentation Project.

He played a large role in the campaign to declassify government documents, via the Freedom of Information Act, relating to the history of the U.S. government's support for the Pinochet dictatorship in Chile.  He is the author of several books, most recently The Pinochet File: A Declassified Dossier on Atrocity and Accountability (The New Press, 2003). Kenneth Maxwell wrote a review in the November/December 2003 issue of Foreign Affairs, creating a controversy about Henry Kissinger's involvement in Operation Condor.
Kornbluh won a 1990 James Aronson Award honorable mention for writing on Central America in The New Yorker.


Early life and career
Kornbluh grew up in Ann Arbor, Michigan, where he graduated from Pioneer High School in 1974. He received a B.A. from Brandeis University in 1978.  He has worked at the National Security Archive since 1986.

Publications 
1987. Nicaragua: The Price of Intervention (Institute for Policy Studies)
1989. The Pinochet File: A Declassified Dossier on Atrocity and Accountability (New York: The New Press)
1989 (with Michael T. Klare). Low Intensity Warfare: How the USA Fights Wars Without Declaring Them (Methuen Publishing Ltd)
1993 (with Malcolm Byrne). The Iran-Contra Scandal: The Declassified History (The New Press, 1993 )
1998 (with James G. Blight). Politics of Illusion : The Bay of Pigs Invasion Reexamined (Boulder, Colorado: Lynne Rienner publishers)
1998. Bay of Pigs Declassified: The Secret CIA Report on the Invasion of Cuba (The New Press.)
2003. The Pinochet File: A Declassified Dossier on Atrocity and Accountability (The New Press).

References

External links 
Biography and articles in The Nation
"Still Hidden: A Full Record Of What the U.S. Did in Chile", The Washington Post, October 24, 1999

Living people
Latin Americanists
Operation Condor
1956 births
Date of birth missing (living people)
People from Ann Arbor, Michigan